Al-Ghazal Football Club is a South Sudanese football club based in Wau, South Sudan, that competes in the South Sudan Football Championship.

Honours
South Sudan National Cup
Runners-up (1 time): 2014

Performance in CAF competitions
CAF Confederation Cup (1 appearance)
2015 – TBD

References

Football clubs in South Sudan